Adriana Geertruida Labij (The Hague, 2 August 1943) is a Dutch actress. Although she is best known to the general public for TV series such as Joop ter Heul and Pleisterkade 17. She was noted for her comedic ability in the musicals such as Madam and Foxtrot, but since her stage debut in 1965 she has mainly played roles in classical and modern plays with the Haagse Comedie, Toneelgroep De Appel and the Ro Theater. Labij also played with the cabaret group Purple.

Biography 
Trudy Labij attended the Girls' School in Arnhem. After hearing Vondel in the municipal theater of her hometown, her love for theater was stimulated. She studied at the Arnhem Theater School and graduated in 1965. Almost immediately after graduating she was recruited into the subsidized theater with the Haagse Comedie company. She made her debut in 1965 in Peter Weiss's play The Persecution and Murder of Jean Paul Marat. She gained great fame in 1968 with her role as Joop ter Heulin the television series of the same name. Labij, who, in addition to her education at drama school, had also taken tap, singing and ballet lessons, was perfect for this series, a musical adaptation of the books by Cissy van Marxveldt.

In addition to her stage career with the Haagse Comedie, Toneelgroep De Appel and the Ro Theater, Labij also acted in feature films such as What see ik!? and television series. In one of these series, Pleisterkade 17, she was noticed by Annie MG Schmidt, who had written the series. Schmidt would put Labij forward in musical and stage productions of her hand, such as Foxtrot, Madam and A tear falls on the tompoes. She also appeared in stage and musical productions by other writers, such as De Stunt by Guus Vleugel. In 1981 she was awarded the Johan Kaart Prijs. Her role in the TV series Zonder Ernst (1992) felt like a personal failure and in 1994 she was replaced by Sjoukje Hooymaayer. Her solo performance Shirley Valentine in 2002 was much appreciated.

Filmography

Television
 1968 Joop ter Heul
 1969 Till Death Do Us Part
 1970 The Fantastic Adventures of the Baron of Münchhausen
 1971 Tinsel
 1974 Waaldrecht
 1975-1977 Plasterkade 17
 1979 The Late Late Lien Show
 1991 Blinds as Rosa Oudshoorn
 1992 Right for his Raab
 1992-1994 Without Seriousness
 1994 12 cities, 13 accidents
 1996 Consultation
 2000 Wildschut & De Vries
 2001 All Stars
 2002 Sinterklaas newsreel as Cleaning Lady
 2004 Baantjer (Episode: De Cock and the murder of the past)
 2007 Keyzer & De Boer Lawyers
 2013 Charlie (Episode 5) as Paula
 2015-2019 Family Kruys as Diny

Film
 1968 The Trial by Fire (TV movie)
 1971 What Do I See!?
 1973 Don't Panic
 1986 In the Shadow of Victory
 1988 Shadow Man as Mevrouw Christine Wisse
 1988 Maurits and The facts (TV movie)
 1990 The Nutcracker Prince
 2004 Erik or the Little Insect Book
 2004 Party!
 2007 Sexsomnia
 2011 Little Dolphin Werewolf
 2018 All You Need Is Love as Tilly

Theater 

 1965 - The persecution and murder of Jean Paul Marat
 1965 - Dylan Thomas
 1966 - Dream of a Midsummer Night
 1966 - Lessons in slander
 1966 - Spring Awakening
 1966 - The Meteor
 1967 - The Stunt
 1967 - Between Horse and Bull
 1967 - Prometheus
 1967 - The Women of Troy
 1969 - There's a hair in my soup
 1970 - Butterflies are free
 1970 - Jump out the window baby, we're getting married
 1971 - Promotion! Promotion!
 1973 - Barefoot in the Park
 1975 - The Pants
 1975 - The Snob
 1976 - Jukebox 2008
 1977 - Foxtrot
 1979 - A tear falls on the tompus
 1981 - Madame
 1982 - Victor, or The Children in Power
 1983 - The Miser
 1983 - The Red Inn
 1984 - Uncle Vanja
 1984 - The Homecoming
 1984 - Doctor Nero
 1985 - Present Christine
 1985 - Faust I & II
 1986 - Would you come upstairs, madam
 1986 - Hay fever
 1986 - Us Know Us
 1987 - Amphitryon
 1987 - Phaeton
 1988 - A Family Affair
 1988 - Happy End
 1989 - Women for River Landscape
 1989 - On Hope of Blessing
 1989 - Macbeth
 1990 - Summer Guests
 1990 - Cat on a hot zinc roof
 1991 - Private Lives
 1992 - We have a horse together
 1993 - Now it's wellecome
 1995 - Eva Bonheur
 1995 - The houseboat
 1996 - Jorrie and Snorrie
 1996 - Stupid Cow!
 1998 - Ionesco / Yalta
 1998 - Yes, yes, love
 1999 - A tear falls on the tompus
 2000 - Mocking Ghosts
 2001 - Shirley Valentine
 2002 - Extra Edition - Purple
 2004 - La Bij
 2004 - The woman who ate her husband
 2005 - If on the Leidseplein...
 2006 - La vie parisienne
 2007 - Six dance lessons in six weeks
 2009 - Sonneveld forever!

References 

1943 births
Living people
20th-century Dutch actresses
21st-century Dutch actresses
Actors from The Hague